Super Canal is a Dominican television network operating from studios in Santo Domingo and broadcasting on channel 33. The station is owned by Supercanal, S.A.
 
Super Canal also operates an international feed, Super Canal Caribe, which is seen on cable and satellite systems in El Salvador, Curaçao and the United States, as well as Dominican View, for the United States market with a focus on news and sports programming, and Tele El Salvador, which is an international channel carrying programs from several Salvadorean television networks.

References

Television stations in the Dominican Republic